Recklinghausen (Westphalian: Riäkelhusen) is the northernmost city in the Ruhr-Area and the capital of the Recklinghausen district. It borders the rural Münsterland and is characterized by large fields and farms in the north and industry in the south. Recklinghausen is the 60th-largest city in Germany and the 22nd-largest city in North Rhine-Westphalia.

History
First mentioned in 1017 as Ricoldinchuson, in 1150 the city was the center of the surrounding Vest Recklinghausen. In 1236, Recklinghausen received town privileges. There is record of Jews in the city as early as 1305. As part of the County of Vest, ownership of Recklinghausen changed several times in the 15th and 16th century, and in 1576, the entire county was pawned to the Elector of Cologne. In 1582–83, again in 1586, and again in 1587, the city was plundered by partisan armies during the Cologne War, a feud over religious parity in Electorate of Cologne and electoral influence in the Holy Roman Empire.

Recklinghausen was also the site of more than 100 witchcraft trials (1514–1710). The trial activity reached a climax twice: In the time period of 1580/81 and again in 1588/89. The last person to be convicted of witchcraft was Anna Spickermann; after spending 16 months in prison, she was sentenced to death by sword and burned afterward.

Circa 1600, the administration of the Vest Recklinghausen was divided into two parts, with the eastern part administered by Recklinghausen. The town of Recklinghausen including the parish of Recklinghausen and the parishes Ahsen, Datteln, Flaesheim, Hamm-Bossendorf, Henrichenburg, Herten, Horneburg, Oer, Suderwich, Waltrop and Westerholt. In 1803-1811 became the capital of a sovereign Principality of the Dukes of Arenberg who retain the title. Circa 1815, the Vest was made a Bürgermeisterei, with the town becoming the seat. In 1819, Herten joined the Recklinghausen Bürgermeisterei, and Erkenschwick followed in 1821.

During World War II, in December 1939, the Stalag XX-B prisoner-of-war camp was founded in the city, however, it was relocated after a few days, and from 1941 to 1943, a forced labour camp was operated in the city. As a target of the Oil Campaign of World War II, oil production at Recklinghausen/Forstezung was bombed by the RAF on 15 January 1945; and South Recklinghausen (Recklinghausen Süd) was captured by the US 137th Infantry on 1 April 1945.

Main sights

Recklinghausen is home to a museum of icons, which includes more than 1,000 Orthodox works from Russia, Greece and the Balkan countries, as well as early Coptic Christian art from Egypt. The icon museum – the largest outside the Orthodox world – was founded in 1956 and reopened after renovation in February 2006 for its 50th anniversary.

The Ruhrfestspielhaus (Ruhr Festival Theatre), whose remodeling in 2001 won the German Architecture Award is home of "Die Liegende Nr 5", a famous sculpture by Henry Moore. At the Lohtor in front of a memorial for the victims of World War I, there is a large sculpture made of more than 30,000 bricks by Per Kirkeby.

Annual events
Recklinghausen hosts the annual Ruhrfestspiele (Ruhr Festival), a cultural festival with an international reputation. Every year there is a cultural programme with many national and international theatrical productions starting on 1 May. In 2008 the programme included the play Speed the Plow starring Kevin Spacey and Jeff Goldblum as one of the major productions. The main theatrical stage is the Ruhrfestspielhaus but other theatres in and around Recklinghausen participate.

Transport
The two major motorways crossing the area of the city are the A2 and the A43. The city is connected to the larger waterways by the Rhein-Herne-Kanal. Recklinghausen has two railway stations. The Central Station (Recklinghausen Hauptbahnhof), which is served by Intercity and EuroCity services, and the South Station (Recklinghausen Südbahnhof).

There are two Rhine-Ruhr S-Bahn - S 2 to Dortmund via Herne - Castrop-Rauxel and S 9 to Hagen via Gladbeck - Bottrop - Essen - Velbert - Wuppertal.

Politics

Mayor
The current mayor of Recklinghausen is Christoph Tesche of the Christian Democratic Union (CDU). The most recent mayoral election was held on 13 September 2020, and the results were as follows:

! colspan=2| Candidate
! Party
! Votes
! %
|-
| bgcolor=| 
| align=left| Christoph Tesche
| align=left| Christian Democratic Union
| 26,556
| 60.8
|-
| bgcolor=| 
| align=left| Andreas Becker
| align=left| Social Democratic Party
| 7,286
| 16.7
|-
| bgcolor=| 
| align=left| Thorben Terwort
| align=left| Alliance 90/The Greens
| 4,031
| 9.2
|-
| bgcolor=| 
| align=left| Sascha Menkhaus
| align=left| Alternative for Germany
| 2,264
| 5.2
|-
| bgcolor=| 
| align=left| Erich Burmeister
| align=left| The Left
| 1,493
| 3.4
|-
| 
| align=left| Claudia Ludwig
| align=left| Independent Citizens Party
| 1,213
| 2.8
|-
| bgcolor=| 
| align=left| Irina Oberpichler
| align=left| Die PARTEI
| 864
| 2.0
|-
! colspan=3| Valid votes
! 43,707
! 99.0
|-
! colspan=3| Invalid votes
! 435
! 1.0
|-
! colspan=3| Total
! 44,142
! 100.0
|-
! colspan=3| Electorate/voter turnout
! 92,107
! 47.9
|-
| colspan=7| Source: City of Recklinghausen
|}

City council

The Recklinghausen city council governs the city alongside the Mayor. The most recent city council election was held on 13 September 2020, and the results were as follows:

! colspan=2| Party
! Votes
! %
! +/-
! Seats
! +/-
|-
| bgcolor=| 
| align=left| Christian Democratic Union (CDU)
| 16,078
| 37.0
|  0.6
| 21
|  2
|-
| bgcolor=| 
| align=left| Social Democratic Party (SPD)
| 10,924
| 25.2
|  12.8
| 14
|  6
|-
| bgcolor=| 
| align=left| Alliance 90/The Greens (Grüne)
| 7,757
| 17.9
|  8.3
| 10
|  5
|-
| bgcolor=| 
| align=left| Alternative for Germany (AfD)
| 2,861
| 6.6
| New
| 4
| New
|-
| bgcolor=| 
| align=left| The Left (Die Linke)
| 1,867
| 4.3
|  1.7
| 2
|  1
|-
| bgcolor=| 
| align=left| Free Democratic Party (FDP)
| 1,561
| 3.6
|  0.4
| 2
| ±0
|-
| 
| align=left| Independent Citizens' Party (UBP)
| 1,477
| 3.4
|  3.4
| 2
|  1
|-
| bgcolor=| 
| align=left| Die PARTEI
| 614
| 1.4
| New
| 1
| New
|-
| colspan=7 bgcolor=lightgrey| 
|-
| bgcolor=| 
| align=left| Ecological Democratic Party (ÖDP)
| 199
| 0.5
| New
| 0
| New
|-
| 
| align=left| Party of Holistic Democracy (PHD)
| 103
| 0.2
| New
| 0
| New
|-
! colspan=2| Valid votes
! 43,441
! 98.4
! 
! 
! 
|-
! colspan=2| Invalid votes
! 687
! 1.6
! 
! 
! 
|-
! colspan=2| Total
! 44,128
! 100.0
! 
! 56
!  4
|-
! colspan=2| Electorate/voter turnout
! 92,107
! 47.9
!  0.4
! 
! 
|-
| colspan=7| Source: City of Recklinghausen
|}

Twin towns – sister cities

Recklinghausen is twinned with:

 Acre, Israel
 Bytom, Poland
 Dordrecht, Netherlands
 Douai, France
 Preston, England, United Kingdom
 Schmalkalden, Germany

Notable people

Louis Engelbert, 6th Duke of Arenberg (1750–1820), prince of Recklinghausen
Prosper Louis, 7th Duke of Arenberg (1785–1861), 2nd prince of Recklinghausen
Fritz Emil Irrgang (1890–1951), Nazi politician and storm trooper
Walter Giller (1927–2011), actor
Karl Ridderbusch (1932–1997), opera singer
Ursula Dirichs (born 1935), actress
Rosemarie Koczy (1939–2007), artist and teacher, concentration camp survivor
Klaus Schulten (1947–2016), biophysicist
Renate Künast (born 1955), politician (Alliance 90/The Greens)
Ralf Möller (born 1959), actor
Ludger Pistor (born 1959), actor
Hape Kerkeling (born 1964), comedian and author
Martin Max (born 1968), footballer
Mark Dragunski (born 1970), handball player
Moguai (born 1973), DJ and producer
Frank Busemann (born 1975), decathlete
Thomas Godoj (born 1978), Polish-German singer, Deutschland sucht den Superstar winner

Mayors since 1809

Bürgermeister
 1809–1833: Alois Joseph Wulff
 1833–1839: Peter Banniza
 1840–1842: Karl Boelmann
 1843–1850: Franz Bracht
 1854–1890: Friedrich Hagemann
 1890–1899: Alexander Rensing
Oberbürgermeister
 1899–1904: Albert von Bruchhausen 
 1904–1919: Peter Heuser
 1919–1931: Sulpiz Hamm
 1932–1939: Fritz Niemeyer
 1939–1945: Fritz Emil Irrgang, NSDAP
 1945–1946: Josef Hellermann, CDU
 1946–1948: Wilhelm Bitter, CDU
 1948–1952: Joseph Dünnebacke, CDU
 1952–1972: Heinrich Auge, SPD
 1972–1984: Erich Wolfram, SPD
Bürgermeister
 1984–1987: Erich Wolfram, SPD
 1987–1998: Jochen Welt, SPD
Hauptamtliche Bürgermeister
 1998–1999: Peter Borggraefe, SPD
 1999–2014: Wolfgang Pantförder, CDU
 2014–: Christoph Tesche, CDU

Gallery

References

External links

Museums of Recklinghausen 
Corpus juris of the county of Recklinghausen

 
Cities in North Rhine-Westphalia
Oil campaign of World War II